Jesse Brown (March 27, 1944 – August 15, 2002) was a veteran of the United States Marine Corps who served as United States Secretary of Veterans Affairs under President Bill Clinton from 1993 to 1997.

Early life
Jesse Brown was born on March 27, 1944, in Detroit, Michigan, to Lucille Marsh Brown and David Brown. He grew up in Chicago, Illinois, and graduated with honors from the City Colleges of Chicago. Married to Sylvia Scott Brown, they had two children, N. Scott Brown and Carmen Brown.

Military service
He enlisted in the United States Marine Corps in 1963, and served as a Marine in the Vietnam War, reaching the rank of corporal. He was seriously injured in 1965 near Da Nang when he was shot in the right arm, which was left partially paralyzed.

Returning to Chicago, in 1967 Brown became active in the Disabled American Veterans (DAV), a service and advocacy organization founded in 1920 to assist disabled veterans. He began taking classes at Roosevelt University in Chicago. Moving to the DAV's national office in Washington, D.C., he began taking classes at The Catholic University of America.

Veterans service

DAV
In 1967, Brown joined the staff of the Disabled American Veterans.  He served in various supervisory roles with the DAV in the 1970s and 1980s:
 1973 — supervisor of National Service Office in Washington, D.C.
 1976 — supervisor of National Appeals Office
 1981 — Chief of Claims, National Service and Legislative Headquarters
 1983 — Deputy National Service Director
In 1988, Brown became the DAV's first African-American executive director, serving until 1993.

Secretary of Veterans Affairs

In January 1993, Brown was selected by President Bill Clinton to the post of Secretary of Veterans Affairs, serving until July 1997. He was the first African American to hold that post. He is also the first former enlisted member of the United States Armed Forces named Secretary of the Department of Veterans Affairs. During his tenure, Brown expanded the services offered to female veterans, homeless veterans, and veterans who were ill due to chemical exposures in Vietnam or the Gulf War. After he resigned as secretary, Brown founded a consulting firm, Brown and Associates.

Disabled veterans' memorial
Brown was one of three people who provided the impetus for the creation of the American Veterans Disabled for Life Memorial, a national memorial in Washington, D.C., which honors disabled veterans. In 1998, philanthropist Lois Pope realized there was no memorial to disabled veterans in the nation's capital. Although she did not know him, Pope called Brown's Veterans Affairs office to plead for a memorial. Pope called every day for the next six months, until finally Brown's secretary put her call through. Brown agreed to support legislation establishing a memorial. Brown introduced Pope to Art Wilson, the National Adjutant (e.g., chief executive officer) of the DAV. The DAV was itself not a nonprofit, and thus Pope and Wilson agreed that a new foundation, the American Veterans Disabled for Life Memorial Foundation (AVDLMF; also known as the Disabled Veterans' LIFE Memorial Foundation) should be created. Brown left office in 1997. Brown, Pope, and Wilson incorporated the foundation in 1998, and Wilson was named its president. Brown served as the executive director of the American Disabled Veterans Disabled for Life Memorial Foundation until his death.

The three individuals and their supporters began lobbying Congress to win passage of the necessary federal legislation. Congress quickly approved the bill, and President Clinton signed it into law (Public Law 106-348) on October 24, 2000. After a decade of fundraising, the memorial began construction in 2011. It was dedicated by President Barack Obama on October 5, 2014. Two quotations by Brown are featured on the memorial.

Death
Brown died in Warrenton, Virginia on August 15, 2002, of lower motor neuron syndrome. He had been diagnosed with amyotrophic lateral sclerosis (ALS), commonly known as Lou Gehrig's Disease, since 1999. His funeral was held at the Washington National Cathedral, and he was buried in Arlington National Cemetery.

He was survived by his wife, Sylvia, and his children Carmen and Scott.

The DAV established the Jesse Brown Memorial Youth Scholarship in his honor. Eight scholarships are awarded each year to youth volunteers (aged 21 or younger) who have worked to assist disabled veterans and advanced the cause of disabled veterans' rights in the name of DAV. Scholarships are awarded in the following amounts:
•	One scholarship of $20,000
•	One scholarship of $15,000
•	One scholarship of $10,000
•	Two scholarships of $7,500
•	Three scholarships of $5,000

Applications are available at www.davscholarships.org. 

In May 2004, the West Side VA Medical Center in Chicago was renamed the Jesse Brown VA Medical Center in his honor.

See also

Disabled American Veterans
List of African-American United States Cabinet members
Vietnam Veterans of America

Notes

References

External links

1944 births
2002 deaths
20th-century American politicians
African-American members of the Cabinet of the United States
United States Marine Corps personnel of the Vietnam War
Burials at Arlington National Cemetery
Catholic University of America alumni
Clinton administration cabinet members
Neurological disease deaths in Virginia
Deaths from motor neuron disease
Politicians from Detroit
People from Fauquier County, Virginia
Roosevelt University alumni
United States Marines
United States Secretaries of Veterans Affairs